Kate Ellen Ebrahim (born 11 November 1991) is a New Zealand cricketer. In August 2018, she was awarded a central contract by New Zealand Cricket, following the tours of Ireland and England in the previous months. In October 2018, she was named in New Zealand's squad for the 2018 ICC Women's World Twenty20 tournament in the West Indies. In April 2022, Ebrahim was named the Hallyburton Johnstone Shield Player of the Year at the annual Otago Cricket Awards.

She is married to former Zimbabwean Test player Dion Ebrahim, who now coaches in New Zealand.

References

External links

1991 births
Living people
New Zealand women cricketers
New Zealand women One Day International cricketers
New Zealand women Twenty20 International cricketers
Cricketers from New Plymouth
Central Districts Hinds cricketers
Canterbury Magicians cricketers
Otago Sparks cricketers
Staffordshire women cricketers